Tillandsia catimbauensis is a species in the genus Tillandsia. This species is endemic to Brazil.

References

catimbauensis
Flora of Brazil